The Sears, Roebuck and Company Retail Department Store Building in Camden, Camden County, New Jersey, United States, was built in 1927 and housed a Sears department store until 1971, when the store relocated to Moorestown Mall. It was South Jersey's first free-standing department store. It was also among the first department stores to be built with its own parking lot, a precursor to the modern shopping mall. It was added to the National Register of Historic Places on July 27, 2000.

After Sears relocated, the building was home at different times to a nightclub, a car dealership, a day care center, and a housing authority office, before becoming vacant for several years. In 2007, it was purchased by Ilan Zaken, owner of the hip-hop clothing company Miskeen Originals, for $2.7 million. Zaken spent more than $1 million on a plan to transform it into his company's headquarters as well as a culinary school and restaurant supply mall, but the project was not completed.

In February 2011, a New Jersey Superior Court judge ruled that the city could acquire the building through eminent domain.

On June 11, 2012, Campbell Soup Company, whose corporate headquarters is nearby, purchased the building for about $3.5 million, with plans to demolish it. Campbell contended that uncertainty surrounding the building impeded its development of an adjacent office park. The purchase effectively ended the ongoing legal battle to preserve the building.

Demolition of the building began on June 5, 2013. It was completed on August 23, 2013.

See also
National Register of Historic Places listings in Camden County, New Jersey

References

Commercial buildings on the National Register of Historic Places in New Jersey
Neoclassical architecture in New Jersey
Commercial buildings completed in 1927
Buildings and structures in Camden, New Jersey
Sears Holdings buildings and structures
Department stores on the National Register of Historic Places
Retail buildings in New Jersey
National Register of Historic Places in Camden County, New Jersey
Buildings and structures demolished in 2013
Demolished buildings and structures in New Jersey
New Jersey Register of Historic Places
1927 establishments in New Jersey
2013 disestablishments in New Jersey